Cheungkongella ancestralis is a tunicate-like organism from the Lower Cambrian Haikou Chengjiang deposits of China.  It was originally described as a tunicate, though, this identification has been questioned, especially with the discovery of another Chengjiang tunicate, Shankouclava.  This challenge to Cheungkongella being a tunicate has led some experts to reassess it as a cambroernid related to Eldonia, Herpetogaster, and most closely to Phlogites, to which it has been subjectively synonymized as.

References

Ascidiacea
Cambrian chordates
Cambrian animals of Asia
Tunicate genera
Prehistoric chordate genera
Fossil taxa described in 2001

Cambrian genus extinctions